Maxfield is both a surname and a given name. Notable people with the name include:

Surname:
 Frederick R. Maxfield, American biochemist
 Ian Maxfield (born 1959), Australian politician
 Jim Maxfield (1893–1953), Australian rules footballer 
 Margaret Maxfield (1926–2016), American mathematician
 Max Maxfield (born 1945), American politician
 Michael Maxfield (born 1961), American local celebrity
 Mike Maxfield (born 1944), English songwriter and guitarist
 Richard Maxfield (1927–1969), American composer
 Stuart Maxfield (born 1972), Australian rules footballer 
 Thomas Maxfield (–1616), English Roman Catholic priest and martyr
 Thomas Maxfield (Methodist) (died 1784), English Wesleyan Methodist preacher
 Valerie Maxfield, British archaeologist
 William Maxfield, British Whig politician
 William Maxfield (cyclist) (1916–1943), English cyclist

Given name:
 Maxfield Parrish, American painter and illustrator